Shariffpura is a locality in Amritsar, India. It was established by a Muslim by the name of Deputy Mohammad Shariff, known as the "Raees of Amritsar" and his son Engineer Fazal ur Rehman Shariff in the early 1920s. Engineer Fazal ur Rehman Shariff did his degree course in civil engineering from Liverpool, England in 1912 and returned to his home in Amritsar. He later joined the Irrigation department in Punjab as SDO and worked on various projects including the Sulemanki Headworks. He was one of the first qualified Muslim engineers in Punjab.

The idea behind Shariffpura was to develop a township for the Muslims of the area. This locality became the refuge and the last safe haven for the Muslims of India, migrating to Pakistan in 1947. Shariffpura was attacked later two months after partition flushing out any survivors.

Muslim communities of India
Cities and towns in Amritsar district
Neighbourhoods in Punjab, India